is a railway station in Funabashi, Chiba, Japan, operated by East Japan Railway Company (JR East) and the private railway operator Tobu Railway.

Lines

It also forms the eastern terminus of the  Tōbu Urban Park Line (Tōbu Noda Line). Passengers can also transfer to nearby Keisei Funabashi Station on the Keisei Main Line.

JR East

The JR East station has two elevated island platforms, with the station building located underneath. The station has a "Midori no Madoguchi" staffed ticket office and also a "View Plaza" travel agency.

Platforms

Tobu

The Tobu station is elevated and consists of a single elevated island platform serving two tracks, with an elevated station building underneath. Access to the JR East station is by a ground-level concourse.

Platforms

History
What is now the JR East Funabashi Station opened on 20 July 1894. The Tobu station opened on 27 December 1923. The JR East (formerly JNR) station opened on 20 July 1952. It became an elevated structure from 26 October 1983. From 17 March 2012, station numbering was introduced on the Tobu Noda Line, with Funabashi Station becoming "TD-35".

Platform edge doors were installed on the Tobu Urban Park Line platforms in early February 2014.

Passenger statistics
In fiscal 2014, the JR East station was used by an average of 135,322 passengers daily (boarding passengers only), making it the 23rd-busiest station operated by JR East. The passenger figures for the JR East station for previous years are as shown below.

In fiscal 2012, the Tobu station was used by an average of 112,000 passengers daily (entering and exiting passengers).

Surrounding area
 Keisei Funabashi Station ( Keisei Main Line)
 Funabashi FACE

See also
 List of railway stations in Japan

References

External links

 JR East station information 
 Tobu station information  

Railway stations in Chiba Prefecture
Stations of East Japan Railway Company
Stations of Tobu Railway
Tobu Noda Line
Funabashi
Railway stations in Japan opened in 1894